The 1990 South Carolina United States Senate election was held on November 6, 1990 to select the U.S. Senator from the state of South Carolina.  Popular incumbent Republican U.S. Senator Strom Thurmond cruised to re-election against Democratic challenger Bob Cunningham.

Primaries 
U.S. Senator Strom Thurmond faced no opposition from South Carolina Republicans and avoided a primary election.  The state Democrats saw this as an unwinnable race so when Bob Cunningham sought the Democratic nomination, he was unopposed in his bid.

General election campaign 

Cunningham launched his second bid to unseat Republican Sen. Strom Thurmond after switching from the GOP to the Democratic Party in early 1990. Though he faced a formidable opponent, Cunningham planned no fund-raising activities. "I don't plan to ask for anything and I won't accept any money from PACs," he said. Cunningham said his campaign strategy was to "go to places where I was invited and spread out my ideas." If elected, Cummingham said he would push to limit consecutive congressional service to 12 years and reform the tax system. He supported greater environmental activism. "I think we're going at it in much too lukewarm a fashion. I think we should work hard to find a substitute for the internal combustion engine."

Cunningham, a retired intelligence officer, had little chance of defeating Strom Thurmond and the election was never a serious contest.  Thurmond overwhelmingly outspent Cunningham in his re-election campaign.

In this election, Thurmond won about 20% of the black vote.

Election results 

 

|-
| 
 | colspan = 5 |Republican hold
|-

See also 
 List of United States senators from South Carolina
 1990 United States Senate elections
 1990 South Carolina gubernatorial election

References 
 

1990
South Carolina
1990 South Carolina elections
Strom Thurmond